Lost on Earth is an American sitcom starring Tim Conlon. The series premiered January 4, 1997 on the USA Network.

Plot

KTEE-TV television reporter David Rudy (Tim Conlon) has just suffered an on-air gaffe that could cost him his job. Rather than be fired, Rudy accepts a demotion from his boss, George Greckin (Paul Gleason), by agreeing to host a children's puppet show. Rudy quickly discovers that the puppets are not props, but are real aliens that became stranded on Earth while exploring the universe. Rudy is also dating the boss's daughter Sherry (Stacy Galina).

Cast
Tim Conlon as David Rudy
Paul Gleason as George Greckin
Stacy Galina as the station's business manager Sherry Greckin
Victor Togunde as Nick
Terri Hardin as Angela

Puppeteers
Peter McCowatt as Phillipe (Alien Leader)
Kevin Carlson as Ahab
Drew Massey as Reliegh
Terri Hardin as Angela
Sandey Grinn as Bram

Episodes

Reception
Steven Linan of the Los Angeles Times called the series "mirthless" and "a lost cause". Linan also stated that the show is "too silly for adults and too coarse for kids". John Levesque of the Seattle Post-Intelligencer did not find the series funny, and said that the scripts were "unimaginative" and "unprofessional". Claude Brooks of The Palm Beach Post said the series "isn't that bad", however "the puppets are funnier than the humans". Brooks referred to the series as essentially "3rd Rock from the Sun meets The Muppet Show".

References

External links

1990s American sitcoms
1997 American television series debuts
1997 American television series endings
1990s American comic science fiction television series
English-language television shows
USA Network original programming
American television shows featuring puppetry